Robert Emery (August 12, 1898 – January 6, 1934) was an American sprinter. He competed in the men's 400 metres at the 1920 Summer Olympics.

References

External links
 

1898 births
1934 deaths
Athletes (track and field) at the 1920 Summer Olympics
American male sprinters
Olympic track and field athletes of the United States
Track and field athletes from Chicago